Gaveh-ye Khalseh (also Romanized as Gaveh-ye Khālṣeh; also known as Gaveh) is a village in Chenaran Rural District, in the Central District of Chenaran County, Razavi Khorasan Province, Iran. At the 2006 census, its population was 441, in 104 families.

References 

Populated places in Chenaran County